British Gymnastics, also known as the British Amateur Gymnastics Association (BAGA), is the sports governing body for gymnastics and Trampolining in the UK.

History
It was founded in 1888 as the Amateur Gymnastics and Fencing Association. Gymnastics had been adopted in this country, having been invented in Germany by Friedrich Ludwig Jahn, to improve the health and fitness of its soldiers. The rings, pommel horse, parallel bars, and horizontal bar were developed by Jahn. In the late 1800s gymnastics became popular for men thanks to the Army Physical Training Corps which was formed in 1860. Walter Tysall won the men's silver medal in the 1908 Olympics. After this time the Swedish form of gymnastics became more popular, a more artistic version developed by Pehr Henrik Ling which was for men and women, and needed little apparatus.

Women first competed at the Olympics in gymnastics at the 1928 Olympics in Amsterdam, where the British women's team took the bronze – its best performance.

After the Second World War, the German and Swedish forms of gymnastics were combined. The 1960 Rome Olympics were the first to be televised, and this led to a greater interest in Britain of gymnastics. This Olympics had been dominated by Russian female gymnasts. In 1963 the Amateur Gymnastics Association became the British Amateur Gymnastics Association, and the BAGA first received a government grant, allowing it to pay coaches, and appoint a full-time national coach, Wray Stuart. He developed the BAGA Awards, a proficiency scheme for young gymnasts, which was adopted by seventy other countries.

The BAGA Awards started to produce results for Britain. Gymnastics were given superstar status by the 1972 Olympics at Munich.

At the 2008 Beijing Olympics, an individual Bronze for Louis Smith was a breakthrough with the first medal in decades.

At the 2012 London Olympics, the Men's Artistic Gymnastics team won Bronze with individual Silver for Louis Smith and Bronze for Max Whitlock on Pommel and individual Bronze for Beth Tweddle on Uneven bars.

BAGA was registered as a company on 20 April 1982. In 1979 the Sports Council had built a gym at Lilleshall, equipped to international standards in 1980, with the Queen Elizabeth Hall. In 1981 a £18,000 feasibility study looked at developing Lilleshall into a national centre, and in October 1982 the Sports Council allocated £1 million to develop a national centre.

Anne, Princess Royal opened the £1.75 million Princess Royal Hall at Lilleshall on 26 April 1988, paid for by the Sports Council. There is also the King George VI Hall and Ford Hall. Use of Lilleshall for gymnastics increased greatly throughout the late 1970s under Derek Tremayne. In 1997 BAGA became British Gymnastics.

Function

It is the main sport governing body for gymnastics throughout the UK, developing gymnasts, coaches clubs and officiating in all gymnastic disciplines.

British Gymnastics aims to meet the following aspirations by 2017:

 Gymnastics is seen as one of the top three sports in the UK
 The British Gymnastics brand is internationally recognized and a household name
 The Gymnastics club is the hub of the local community
 Success creates global icons

The eight strategic priorities of the 2013-2017 plan are as follows:

 Create a brand that reflects the values of the sport and unifies the gymnastics community in the UK
 Ensure systems and processes enable the effective and efficient delivery of the sport in the UK
 Invest in the development of coaches and associated delivery systems
 Define new markets/experiences for the 9+ cohort and introduce strategies to stimulate greater participation
 Strengthen and support the high performance network/system across all disciplines
 Increase club access to facilities and new spaces resulting from austerity measures being introduced in local government and businesses
 Assist clubs and coaches to fill the gap in service provision in schools and identify future talent
 Create a spectacular event in every major city designed to entertain a non-gymnastics’ audience

Publications
Its main publication is The Gymnast, having been published since 1959. Since 2011 it has been released in an online format only  Most news is now released via the British Gymnastics Website, Social Media and the weekly Gymblast email newsletter

See also
 Whyte Review that detailed sexual, physical and emotional abuse in gymnastics in Britain
 Great Britain women's national gymnastics team

References

External links
 
 Gymnastics Clubs Directory

Video clips
 BGTV YouTube channel

1888 establishments in the United Kingdom
Gymnastics in the United Kingdom
Great Britain
Organisations based in Shropshire
Sport in Shropshire
Gymnastics
Sports organizations established in 1888